Su-ngai Padi railway station is a railway station located in Paluru Subdistrict, Su-ngai Padi District, Narathiwat.

Services 
 Special Express No. 37/38 Bangkok-Sungai Kolok-Bangkok
 Rapid No. 171/172 Bangkok-Sungai Kolok-Bangkok
 Rapid No. 175/176 Hat Yai Junction-Sungai Kolok-Hat Yai Junction
 Local No. 447/448 Surat Thani-Sungai Kolok-Surat Thani
 Local No. 451/452 Nakhon Si Thammarat-Sungai Kolok-Nakhon Si Thammarat
 Local No. 453/454 Yala-Sungai Kolok-Yala
 Local No. 463/464 Phatthalung-Sungai Kolok-Phatthalung

References 
 
 

Railway stations in Thailand